The 1927–28 season was Real Madrid Club de Fútbol's 26th season in existence. The club played some friendly matches including their first ever tour of the Americas. They also played in the Campeonato Regional Centro (Central Regional Championship), the Copa del Rey and the Copa Federación Centro (Central Federation Cup).

The competition was played with a make shift schedule and the teams had been scheduled to play each other in a double round-robin format, however all matches could not be played, and some teams including Real Madrid only played 9 games. The Torneo de Campeones served as a rehearsal for the establishment of La Liga, the first national football league in Spain, the following season.

Friendlies

Competitions

Overview

Torneo de Campeones

Campeonato Regional Centro

League table

Matches

Copa del Rey

Qualifying round

Group stage

Quarter-finals

Copa Federación Centro

Notes

References

Real Madrid
Real Madrid CF seasons